Mr. Interesting's Guide to the Continental United States was a 6-part radio series broadcast on CBC Radio One Saturday afternoons during the third hour of Definitely Not the Opera in the summer of 2000. Like its predecessor Running with Scissors with Mr. Interesting in 1999, it starred Dan Redican reprising the title role from The Frantics' Frantic Times radio series.

Background 
This often-surreal comedy show featured a number of sketches strung together that formed a rough narrative having Mr. Interesting and his best friend Eddie (a giant talking carp played by Colin Mochrie), smuggle themselves across the Canada–US border and who are then beset by a number of odd situations and characters.

The basic format of the show had the main story of Mr. Interesting and Eddie making their way illegally across the Canada–US border, and then through the mid-west and eventually to Hollywood. Interspersed with this storyline were "slice-of-life" sketched involving other random characters. Some of these skits included an Amish farmer dating a supermodel, a bickering family in a car who collide with a beam of God's pure love, and a man visiting a shoe store looking for gay-friendly shoes. The show was ultimately less an exposé of life in the United States and more an exploration of contemporary mores, American cultural clichés and a sometimes scathing critique of the show business industry. Perhaps tellingly, both Mr. Interesting and Eddie the carp are ultimately gunned down and die by the show's conclusion.

The shows were recorded live in front of an audience at the Toronto's Tim Sims Theatre over a three-day period, from April 13–15, 2000. Besides Redican and Mochrie, the cast also included Kathy Greenwood and Kathleen Laskey. It was written by Redican and Jenny Hacker.

External links
Short reference to the show on The Unofficial Frantics Web Site

CBC Radio One programs
Canadian radio sketch shows
2000 radio programme debuts
2000 radio programme endings